The Port of Eden is a small seaport situated in Twofold Bay, adjacent to the town of Eden, located in the South Coast region of New South Wales, Australia.

The Port is home to one of the largest fishing fleets in New South Wales; and woodchip export is currently the major trade for the port, exporting  for the year to 30 June 2011. Major vessel movements occur between Japan, China and Korea.

Principal imports are break bulk and machinery and equipment, mainly for the oil and gas industry. Principal exports are hardwood and softwood woodchips, softwood logs, explosives, and machinery and equipment for the oil and gas industry.

Since 1 July 2014, the port has been managed by Port Authority of NSW, a corporation owned by the NSW Government.

Industries 

The port is a principal export point for timber products. During the year ended 30 June 2011, South East Fibre Exports Pty Limited exported  in woodchips to customers located in Japan and Korea. Woodchip storage and packaging facilities were constructed by Harris Daishowa in 1971.

A substantial fishing fleet also operates from the port and from Snug Cove.

Minor port uses include import and export services for the towns of Eden, Bega, Bombala and Cooma, and as a stopover for national and international cruise ships.

In 1960 Mobil constructed a dedicated wharf, tanks and plant for small-scale petroleum imports and distribution to southern New South Wales.

Approximately 70 commercial vessels visited the Port of Eden during the year ended 30 June 2012; including two passenger cruise ships. Civilian shipping movements in the port are regulated by a harbour master appointed by NSW Maritime.

The port is also shared with the Department of Defence and serviced approximately 30 Royal Australian Navy ships for the year ended 30 June 2012. The Navy facility consists of a wharf, an access jetty and road, and a land-based munitions store  from the bay and surrounded by a  exclusion zone.

Facilities 
The port consists of two commercial shipping wharves, the Mobil petroleum wharf, a cargo storage area and ancillary facilities.

The Breakwater Wharf caters for the timber industry, the fishing fleet and cruise shipping. The wharf itself is concrete with rubber fending.

Storage capacity was estimated to reach  in 2010/11.

Cruise terminal
The NSW Government spent  on an extension of Breakwater Wharf so that visiting cruise ships do not need to use ship's tenders to bring passengers ashore. The first cruise ship to use the updated wharf was the Pacific Explorer that visited on 14September 2019.

On 11April 2022 a proposal was announced to allow more than 60 cruise vessels a year to dock as well as allowing the berth to be used between 10pm and 7am with consultations beginning in mid April ahead of a decision by mid 2023. The proposal would also include additional infrastructure to allow for Oasis-class cruise ships to dock.

History

European history
The bay was first charted by explorer George Bass in 1797 and has been used for commercial whaling and fishing since the 1840s. From the 1850s to 1950s the port was serviced by steamship companies, including the Illawarra Steam Navigation Company.

Gallery

See also

List of ports in Australia

References

External links
 Official website
 

Eden
South Coast (New South Wales)
Eden, New South Wales
Fishing communities in Australia